Old Pine Street Church is a Presbyterian Church in Philadelphia, Pennsylvania built in 1768.

American Revolution
Old Pine became known as the "Church of the Patriots", because many of the parishioners such as John Adams, stood with George Washington. George Duffield served as pastor from 1772 until 1790; during the American Revolution, Duffield served as a chaplain of the Continental Congress.

Cemetery
The churchyard dates to the congregation's place in the American Revolution. The church counts those buried to include

 A signer of the Constitution of the United States
 3 Continental Congress attendees
 2 colonial printers
 Over 200 Revolutionary War soldiers
 1 Tory
 Ringer of the Liberty Bell
 9 members of the Carpenter's Company of Philadelphia

The cemetery also includes medical doctors, lawyers, sea captains, silversmiths, stonemasons, tavern keepers, tradesmen, and everyday citizens from the Colonial era. The last interment in the churchyard was in 1958 for In Ho Oh, a murdered University of Pennsylvania student.

Notable burials
Jared Ingersoll (17491822), lawyer and statesman
Joel Barlow Sutherland (17921861), U.S. Congressman

Current activity

Old Pine is now the only remaining Presbyterian building in Philadelphia from before the American Revolutionary War, Joseph Bonaparte was married here in 1820.

Continuing its more than 200 years of community activism, Old Piners were among the first to respond to the problem of the homeless on the streets of our city. In 1982, it founded and, in the beginning, sheltered the Philadelphia Committee for the Homeless. In 1978, Old Pine started its Saturday for Seniors (SFS) program to provide a weekend hot lunch and take-home snack for the city's elderly—a Philadelphia first. With no charge and no means test, SFS has become a vital weekend home for more than 100 older people from all over the city. Old Pine continues its commitment to serve the poor in the 21st century. The congregation participates in a local Habitat for Humanity project in the Point Breeze neighborhood of Philadelphia, joining with other Presbyterian congregations to jump-start development there and in surrounding blocks. In addition, it sends members to communities impacted by natural disasters: the Gulf Coast to help the clean-up and rebuilding effort in the wake of the disastrous Hurricane Katrina; flooding disasters in Huntington, West Virginia and Towanda, Pennsylvania; Bayville, New Jersey after Hurricane Sandy.

References

External links

https://archive.org/details/oldpinestreetch00churgoog

Cemeteries in Philadelphia
Churches completed in 1768
1704 establishments in Pennsylvania
18th-century Presbyterian church buildings in the United States
Presbyterian churches in Pennsylvania
Churches in Philadelphia
History of Philadelphia